Union of Communist Struggles – Reconstructed (in French: Union des Luttes Communistes - Reconstruite, ULC-R) was a communist party in Burkina Faso. ULC-R was formed in 1983 as a continuation of the Union of Communist Struggles (ULC). Generally ULC-R was simply called 'ULC'. ULC-R promoted 'Popular and Democratic Revolution' (RDP).

ULC-R supported the revolutionary government of Thomas Sankara. August 3, 1983-August 1984 ULC-R held three ministerial posts. The support to Sankara's government provoked the ULC-R section in France to split away from the mother organization.

After the break between Sankara and LIPAD in August 1984, the position of ULC-R was somewhat strengthened. ULC-R held four cabinet posts in the new government, Basile Guissou (Foreign Affairs), Adele Ouédrago (Budget), Alain Coeffé (Transport and Communications) and Joséphine Ouédraogo (Family and National Solidarity).

In 1987 Sankara tried to marginalize a dissident faction of ULC-R. This was one of the factors that provoked the coup d'état of Blaise Compaoré.

In 1989 ULC-R resigns from the government, following its refusal to go along with the formation of ODP/MT. ULC-R enters a clandestine existence. The government tries to rally dissidents of ULC-R into its new party. In March 1990 it was renamed in Party of Social Democracy.

Political parties established in 1983
Communist parties in Burkina Faso
Formerly ruling communist parties
Defunct political parties in Burkina Faso